The Harrison Commercial Historic District, in Harrison, Idaho, is a historic district which was listed on the National Register of Historic Places in 1996.  The listing included six contributing buildings.

The commercial district of Harrison was mostly destroyed in a fire in 1917.  Some businessmen rebuilt in fireproof construction.  The historic district includes most of the rebuilt area including six brick buildings dating from 1917 or shortly thereafter, and a metal grain elevator built in 1955 which is the only non-contributing structure in the district.  It also includes a non-rebuilt city block which is a city park.

It includes, on the east side of Coeur D'Alene Ave.:
Bridgeman Building
Corskie Building
Marier and Brass/Paulsen building 

And it includes, from south to north along west side of Coeur D'Alene Ave. (Idaho State Highway 97):
I.O.O.F. Building
City park
Masonic Temple
E.C. Hayes and Sons grain elevator
Theatre/Armstrong Garage

Gallery

References

External links

National Register of Historic Places in Kootenai County, Idaho
Historic districts on the National Register of Historic Places in Idaho
Buildings and structures completed in 1917